Diversey is an 'L' station on the CTA Brown Line; Purple Line express trains also stop at the station during weekday rush hours. It is an elevated station with two side platforms, located in the Lincoln Park neighborhood of Chicago, Illinois. Red Line trains pass through the station on the middle tracks, but do not stop.

History
Diversey station opened on June 9, 1900, as a local station on the original Northwestern Elevated Railroad route from Lake and Wells in downtown to Wilson Station. From the late 1940s Diversey became a station on the Ravenswood route (now the Brown Line). Purple Line express trains began stopping at the station in 1998 as part of an effort to help alleviate congestion on the Brown Line.

Brown Line Capacity Expansion Project

Diversey was reconstructed and renovated as part of the Brown Line Capacity Expansion Project. The new station is located on the south side of Diversey Parkway, and the current location (the north side) was preserved and restored (the future use of the restored original station building is currently unknown). An auxiliary exit is located next door to the original building. It features extended platforms capable of berthing eight railcars, and elevators to meet ADA accessibility requirements. It also retains many of its historic elements. On June 25, 2007, the station closed for reconstruction. The station reopened with a temporary entrance (located next door to the original entrance) on March 30, 2008. The new permanent station entrance opened on August 4, 2008.

Bus connections
CTA
  76 Diversey

Notes and references

Notes

References

External links 

 Train schedule (PDF) at CTA official site
Diversey Parkway entrance from Google Maps Street View

CTA Brown Line stations
CTA Purple Line stations
Railway stations in the United States opened in 1900